Rasa Leleivytė (born 22 July 1988) is a Lithuanian professional road racing cyclist, who currently rides for UCI Women's Continental Team .

In 2021 Leleivytė won the Lithuanian Female Cyclist of the Year award.

Doping
On July 18, 2012, it was announced that she failed a doping test on June 12 of the same year and that her A sample was consistent with the use of EPO. Leilevytė had to pay a 5040 Euro fine and was suspended for two years until 13 July 2014.

Major results

2005
 3rd  Road race, UCI Juniors World Championships
 3rd Road race, National Road Championships
2006
 1st  Road race, UCI Juniors World Championships
2007
 1st  Road race, National Road Championships
 3rd  Road race, UEC European Road Championships
 4th Grand Prix de Dottignies
2008
 1st  Road race, UEC European Road Championships
 1st Giro del Valdarno
 2nd Classica Citta di Padova
 3rd GP Carnevale d'Europa
 5th Overall La Route de France
 7th Overall Tour Féminin en Limousin
1st Young rider classification
2009
 1st  Road race, National Road Championships
 4th Road race, UEC European Road Championships
 8th GP de Plouay – Bretagne
2010
 1st GP Comune di Cornaredo
 1st Stage 3 Trophée d'Or Féminin
 3rd Road race, National Road Championships
 3rd Overall Ladies Tour of Qatar
1st Stage 1
 4th GP Liberazione
 8th Road race, UCI Road World Championships
 8th Road race, UEC European Road Championships
 10th GP de Plouay – Bretagne
2011
 1st  Road race, National Road Championships
 1st GP Comune di Cornaredo
 3rd Overall Giro della Toscana Int. Femminile – Memorial Michela Fanini
 4th GP Liberazione
 5th Overall Giro del Trentino Alto Adige-Südtirol
 5th Grand Prix de Dottignies
 5th Tour of Chongming Island World Cup
 9th Road race, UCI Road World Championships
 9th GP de Plouay – Bretagne
2012
 5th Grand Prix de Dottignies
 9th GP Comune di Cornaredo
2015
 3rd SwissEver GP Cham-Hagendorn
 8th Overall Auensteiner–Radsporttage
 10th GP de Plouay
2016
 4th Giro dell'Emilia Internazionale Donne Elite
 5th Road race, UEC European Road Championships
 6th Gooik–Geraardsbergen–Gooik
 6th Gran Premio Bruno Beghelli Internazionale Donne Elite
 7th La Classique Morbihan
2017
 2nd Road race, National Road Championships
 2nd Gran Premio della Liberazione
 2nd Giro dell'Emilia Internazionale Donne Elite
 7th Tour of Flanders for Women
 7th Gran Premio Bruno Beghelli Internazionale Donne Elite
2018
 1st  Road race, National Road Championships
 1st Giro dell'Emilia Internazionale Donne Elite
 2nd La Classique Morbihan
 3rd Gran Premio della Liberazione
 5th Road race, UEC European Road Championships
 6th Brabantse Pijl Dames Gooik
 9th Flanders Ladies Classic
 10th Gran Premio Bruno Beghelli Internazionale Donne Elite
2019
 3rd Overall Giro delle Marche in Rosa
 4th Overall Giro della Toscana Int. Femminile – Memorial Michela Fanini
 4th Giro dell'Emilia Internazionale Donne Elite
 9th Road race, European Games
 10th Road race, UEC European Road Championships
2020
 2nd Giro dell'Emilia Internazionale Donne Elite
 6th Brabantse Pijl Dames Gooik
2021
 2nd Overall Giro della Toscana Int. Femminile – Memorial Michela Fanini
 3rd  Road race, UEC European Road Championships
 4th Giro dell'Emilia Internazionale Donne Elite
2022
 4th Gran Premio della Liberazione

References

External links
 
 

1988 births
Living people
Lithuanian female cyclists
Sportspeople from Vilnius
Lithuanian sportspeople in doping cases
Doping cases in cycling
European Games competitors for Lithuania
Cyclists at the 2019 European Games
Olympic cyclists of Lithuania
Cyclists at the 2020 Summer Olympics
21st-century Lithuanian women